This is a list of schools in Wong Tai Sin District, Hong Kong.

Secondary schools

 Government
 Lung Cheung Government Secondary School

 Aided
  (佛教孔仙洲紀念中學)
 CCC Heep Woh College (中華基督教會協和書院)
  (中華基督教會基協中學)
  (中華基督教會扶輪中學)
  (佛教志蓮中學)
 Choi Hung Estate Catholic Secondary School (彩虹邨天主教英文中學)
 Ho Lap College (sponsored by Sik Sik Yuen) (可立中學（嗇色園主辦）)
  (潔心林炳炎中學)
  (李求恩紀念中學)
  (樂善堂王仲銘中學)
 Lok Sin Tong Yu Kan Hing Secondary School (樂善堂余近卿中學)
 Ng Wah Catholic Secondary School (天主教伍華中學)
 Our Lady's College (聖母書院)
  (五旬節聖潔會永光書院)
  (保良局何蔭棠中學)
  (保良局第一張永慶中學)
  (救世軍卜維廉中學)
  (聖公會聖本德中學)
  (聖文德書院)
  (香港神託會培敦中學)
 Tak Oi Secondary School (德愛中學)

 Direct Subsidy Scheme
 Good Hope School (德望學校)

 Private
 International Christian Quality Music Secondary and Primary School (國際基督教優質音樂中學暨小學)

Primary schools

 Government
 Wong Tai Sin Government Primary School (黃大仙官立小學)

 Aided
 Baptist Rainbow Primary School (浸信會天虹小學)
 Bishop Ford Memorial School (福德學校)
 Bishop Walsh Primary School (華德學校)
 Canossa Primary School (嘉諾撒小學)
 Canossa Primary School (San Po Kong) (嘉諾撒小學（新蒲崗）)
 CCC Kei Tsz Primary School (中華基督教會基慈小學)
 CCC Kei Wa Primary School (中華基督教會基華小學)
 Choi Wan St Joseph's Primary School (彩雲聖若瑟小學)
 Chun Tok School (真鐸學校)
 Confucian Tai Shing Primary School (孔教學院大成小學)
 Ho Lap Primary School (sponsored by Sik Sik Yuen) (嗇色園主辦可立小學)
 Islamic Dharwood Pau Memorial Primary School (伊斯蘭鮑伯濤紀念小學)
 Ng Wah Catholic Primary School (天主教伍華小學)
 PLK Grandmont Primary School (保良局錦泰小學)
 PLK Mrs Chan Nam Chong Memorial Primary School (保良局陳南昌夫人小學)
 Po Yan Oblate Primary School (獻主會溥仁小學)
 Price Memorial Catholic Primary School (天主教博智小學)
 SKH Kei Tak Primary School (聖公會基德小學)
 St Bonaventure Catholic Primary School (聖文德天主教小學)
 St Patrick's Catholic Primary School (Po Kong Village Road) (聖博德天主教小學（蒲崗村道）)
 St Patrick's School (聖博德學校)
 Tsz Wan Shan Catholic Primary School (慈雲山天主教小學)
 TWS St Bonaventure Catholic Primary School (慈雲山聖文德天主教小學)
 Wong Tai Sin Catholic Primary School (黃大仙天主教小學)

 Private
 Assembly of God St. Hilary's College (神召會德萃書院)
 Good Hope Primary School cum Kindergarten (德望小學暨幼稚園)
 International Christian Quality Music Secondary & Primary School (國際基督教優質音樂中學暨小學)
 Our Lady's Primary School (聖母小學)

Special schools

 Aided
 Caritas Pelletier School (明愛培立學校)
 Hong Kong Red Cross Margaret Trench School (香港紅十字會瑪嘉烈戴麟趾學校)
 Rhenish Church Grace School (禮賢會恩慈學校)

References

Lists of schools in Hong Kong
Wong Tai Sin District